The Stapylton baronetcy, or Stapleton, of Myton in Yorkshire, was created in the Baronetage of England on 22 June 1660 for Henry Stapylton.

Stapylton was a Member of Parliament for Boroughbridge. The second Baronet represented Aldborough and Boroughbridge in Parliament. The third Baronet was Member of Parliament for Boroughbridge. The fourth Baronet sat as a Knight of the Shire for Yorkshire. The title became extinct on the death of the eighth Baronet in 1817.

Stapylton baronets, of Myton (1660)
 Sir Henry Stapylton, 1st Baronet (died 1679)
 Sir Bryan Stapylton, 2nd Baronet (died 1727)
 Sir John Stapylton, 3rd Baronet (died 1733)
 Sir Miles Stapylton, 4th Baronet (died 1752)
 Sir Bryan Stapylton, 5th Baronet (died 1772)
 Sir John Stapylton, 6th Baronet (died 1785)
 The Rev. Sir Martin Stapylton, 7th Baronet (died 1801)
 Sir Martin Stapylton, 8th Baronet (died 1817). He left no issue, and the baronetcy was extinct at his death.

Notes

Extinct baronetcies in the Baronetage of England
1660 establishments in England
1817 disestablishments in the United Kingdom